Bekir Sami Günsav (1879 in Bandırma – 1934 in Istanbul) was a Turkish career officer, who served in the Ottoman Army and the Turkish Army.

He was born in the village of Haydar in the district of Bandırma to father Hasan Bey and mother Aishe. Hasan Bey was a member of the Circassian family who moved from Caucasus to Anatolia. Their family name was Zarukhue.

He fought the first stage the Turkish War of Independence as the commander of 56th Division.

Works
(Ed. Muhittin Ünal), Miralay Bekir Sami Günsav'ın Kurtuluş Savaşı Anıları, Cem Yayınevi, 2002, .

See also
List of high-ranking commanders of the Turkish War of Independence

Sources

1879 births
1934 deaths
People from Bandırma
People from Hüdavendigâr vilayet
Turkish people of Circassian descent
Ottoman Military Academy alumni
Ottoman Military College alumni
Ottoman Army officers
Ottoman military personnel of the Balkan Wars
Ottoman military personnel of World War I
Turkish Army officers
Turkish military personnel of the Greco-Turkish War (1919–1922)
Recipients of the Medal of Independence with Red Ribbon (Turkey)